Douglas Gordon McNab (born 3 July 1956) is a Scottish former footballer, who played for Alloa Athletic, Partick Thistle, Hamilton Academical, Dumbarton and Meadowbank Thistle.

References

1956 births
Living people
Footballers from Edinburgh
Scottish footballers
Association football goalkeepers
Alloa Athletic F.C. players
Partick Thistle F.C. players
Hamilton Academical F.C. players
Dumbarton F.C. players
Livingston F.C. players
Scottish Football League players